WEVR (1550 AM) is a radio station  broadcasting a soft adult contemporary format. Licensed to River Falls, Wisconsin, United States.  The station is currently owned by Hanten Broadcasting Co. Inc.

References

External links
FCC History Cards for WEVR

EVR
Soft adult contemporary radio stations in the United States
River Falls, Wisconsin